Paralatonia is an extinct genus of prehistoric Alytid frog from the late Cretaceous of Sânpetru and Densuş-Ciula Formation, Hațeg Island, modern day Romania.

See also
 Prehistoric amphibian
 List of prehistoric amphibians

References 

Cretaceous amphibians of Europe